Kerry Murphy may refer to:
Kerry Murphy (musicologist), Australian musicologist
Kerry Murphy (American football) (born 1988), American football player